The Bangladesh Rifles revolt (also referred to as the Pilkhana tragedy) was a mutiny staged on 25 and 26 February 2009 in Dhaka by a section of the Bangladesh Rifles (BDR), a paramilitary force mainly tasked with guarding the borders of Bangladesh. The rebelling BDR soldiers took over the BDR headquarters in Pilkhana, killing BDR director-general Shakil Ahmed along with 56 other army officers and 17 civilians. They also fired on civilians, held many of their officers and their families hostage, vandalised property and looted valuables . By the second day, unrest had spread to 12 other towns and cities. The mutiny ended as the mutineers surrendered their arms and released the hostages after a series of discussions and negotiations with the government. Prime Minister Sheikh Hasina, who returned to office less than two months before the revolt, was widely praised domestically and internationally for her handling of the mutiny, however some criticised her for not ordering an armed raid of the BDR Rifles compound. The Daily Star commended "her sagacious handling of the situation which resulted in the prevention of a further bloodbath".

On 5 November 2013, Dhaka Metropolitan Sessions Court sentenced 152 people to death and 161 to life imprisonment; another 256 people received sentences between three and ten years for their involvement in the mutiny. The court also acquitted 277 people who had been charged. The trials have been condemned as unfair mass trials without timely access to lawyers and "seem designed to satisfy a desire for cruel revenge", as charged by Human Rights Watch, Amnesty International and the United Nations High Commission for Human Rights.

First day

The mutiny started on the second day of the annual "BDR Week", which was earlier inaugurated by Prime Minister Sheikh Hasina. As the session began at the "Darbar Hall" auditorium, a number of jawans (privates) spoke against the higher-ranked army officials, while BDR Director General Maj. Gen. Shakil Ahmed was making a speech. They demanded the removal of army officials from the BDR command and equal rights for BDR soldiers. Soon they took the Director General and other senior officials as hostages inside the auditorium, and later fired on them. They also prepared heavy weaponry at the main entrance gates of the headquarters. The Bangladesh Army moved in and took up strong positions surrounding BDR headquarters.

The Director General of the BDR, Shakil Ahmed, was killed early during the first day of the revolt, along with dozens of other senior commanders of the BDR, when rebels attacked the residences of the officers and killed Ahmed. They also raided Ahmed's house and looted valuables. Additionally, at least six civilians, including a boy, were killed in the crossfire.

Prime Minister Sheikh Hasina on 25 February offered a general amnesty for the rebels except for those involved in the murdering of army officers, looting and other crimes against the state.

The mutineers had produced a 22-point demand, including the withdrawal of seconded regular army officers from the BDR. Instead, they wanted original BDR members to be promoted from the ranks. They demanded that their officials be selected on the basis of the Bangladesh Civil Service examination. While speaking to private television networks, BDR jawans alleged that senior officials of BDR were involved in a conspiracy, accusing the army officers of embezzling soldiers' wage bonuses from the Operation Dal-Bhaat Program and from extra duties in the general elections held on 29 December 2008. Operation Dal-Bhaat was a welfare program run by the BDR to provide rice and other daily essentials to the poor. Other demands included 100% rationing, introduction of BDR soldiers in peacekeeping missions and improvements to the overall welfare of BDR members.

Second day
Home Minister Sahara Khatun convinced some mutineers to give up their arms by assuring them that the army would not go into the BDR headquarters. As a result, the rebels began to surrender their arms and release the hostages. However, as this was happening in Dhaka, revolts by other members of the BDR started in at least 12 other towns and cities. Fighting and takeovers by the BDR was reported in Chittagong, at Feni, on the eastern border with India, in Rajshahi in the northwest and Sylhet in the north.

By 26 February, BDR outposts at more than 46 locations were reported to have shown signs of great agitation. BDR jawans had claimed to have taken command of Jessore BDR garrison as well as major BDR establishments in Satkhira, Dinajpur, Naogaon and Netrokona.
Army tanks and APCs were brought outside as the army took position, but they could not move as officers were kept as hostages. BDR headquarters had heavy weapons inside that were controlled by the rebels. The army was preparing for a final assault as tanks were rolling down the streets of Dhaka. Paratroops and commandos were ready, but the PM tried to solve the case without any casualties.

As per media tickers, BDR members again started surrendering their arms after the PM addressed the nation and reassured BDR personnel that no action would be taken against them. However, she also warned the mutineers of "harsh actions" if they did not immediately lay down their arms and cease all hostilities. Following the speech of Sheikh Hasina, the army deployed tanks in front of BDR headquarters. After that, the mutineers surrendered their arms as described by the media spokesman of the Prime Minister. Following the surrender, Armed Police Battalion took over BDR headquarters.

Third day

On 27 February about 200 mutineers were arrested while trying to escape from their headquarters at Pilkhana in civilian outfits. Army tanks and troops entered the headquarters of the BDR. Home minister Sahara Khatun had assured that the army had entered under the supervision of the Home Ministry. She also said that BDR personnel were kept at a safer place inside the headquarters and the army had entered to help with the rescue and search operations. Bangladesh army tanks rolled throughout Dhaka in a show of force, which persuaded the remaining mutineers to lay down their arms and surrender. It was still unclear whether the mutiny had been aborted in at least 12 BDR bases outside of Dhaka. As searches for missing personnel continued inside the headquarters, 42 more bodies were found and it was wrongly thought that more than 130 regular army officers had been killed by the rebels. As of 27 February, the official death toll had risen to 54. The body of BDR chief Maj. Gen. Shakil Ahmed was found among those of 41 other army officials. A mass grave was found inside, near the BDR hospital. A total of 42 officers were found buried inside a seven-foot-deep hole. Some bodies had been thrown into drain tunnels. Out of 58 bodies that were found, 52 were army officials. Beginning on 27 February, the government declared a three-day period of national mourning.

Fourth day
The body of the BDR chief's wife was recovered as three more mass graves were found. Many of the bodies had badly decomposed and were difficult to identify. Military Intelligence (MI) announced that the body count in the mutiny at BDR headquarters stood at 63, while 72 army officers still remained missing. Of the 63 bodies, 47 were identified. The army postponed the funerals of those who died until all the bodies were found. Thirty-one officers deputised to the paramilitary force survived the revolt.

Newly appointed BDR Director Maj Gen. Moinul Hossain said their immediate task
would be to "regain the command structure" of the paramilitary force.

Lt. Gen. M.A. Mubin, the army's second-in-command, said the killers would be punished. "The BDR troops who took part in these barbaric and grisly acts cannot be pardoned and will not be pardoned", he said in a televised address, AFP reported.

Bangladesh Rifles (BDR) members who were absent from their workplaces without any leave or permission following the mutiny were asked to report to BDR headquarters or the nearest sector headquarters or battalion headquarters or police stations within 24 hours, but only about 100 responded.

Prime Minister's address to Army at Dhaka Cantonment and end of the revolt
On 1 March 2009, Prime Minister Sheikh Hasina went to Dhaka Cantonment to brief 500 army officers about the mutiny. Hasina was strongly discouraged from attending the meeting by senior members of her cabinet, however she attended as she believed it was her duty to hear the grievances of her people. Hasina attended the meeting with her Defence and Security adviser Major-General Tarique Ahmed Siddique and Agriculture Minister Matia Chowdhury. 

The meeting lasted two and a half hours and began with a moment of silence for those killed in the mutiny. The atmosphere of the meeting was riotous. During the meeting, army officers reportedly broke chairs and hit their heads against the walls. Some army officers demanded public executions for those guilty of murder. The meeting ended with prayers. After the meeting, seven army officers were dismissed by General Moeen U Ahmed because of disrespectful conduct towards the Prime Minister. The mutiny was finally acknowledged as having ended that day.

Casualties
A total of 74 people were killed. Among them were 57 army officers seconded to the BDR. The Chief of the BDR, the Deputy Chief and all 16 Sector Commanders died during the revolt.

Aftermath
On 2 March 2009 a state funeral was held for 49 army officers, who were buried with full military honours; the wife of the Director General, who was also killed, was buried on the same day. The government established an investigative committee to determine the causes behind the rebellion, with Home Minister Sahara Khatun as the chair. The committee was later reformed and reinforced after opposition and pressure groups speculated that it might not function impartially, as the Home Minister herself is investigating an incident of her own ministry. The Bangladesh Army also formed an investigation committee that began proceedings on 3 March. The Army, with the help of RAB and police, has started the "Operation Rebel Hunt" to capture the BDR rebels. The government has also undertaken a decision to change the name and framework of Bangladesh Rifles and deployed the army across the country for an indeterminate period. The government asked for FBI and Scotland Yard to assist the investigation.

Trials and sentencing
Trials began soon after the first arrests. Members of the 37th Rifles Battalion were tried on 13 November 2010. They were charged with looting firearms and ammunition from the armoury and firing their weapons, creating panic in the city, desecrating the portrait of BDR DG Maj. Gen. Shakil Ahmed and giving provocative statements before the media. BDR personnel of the 39th Rifles Battalion were accused of looting firearms, firing shots and siding with the Dhaka mutineers, who killed the top ranks of the force in February. As of January 2011, thousands were tried in Bangladesh for the mutiny.

The mutineers were subjected to widespread abuse in custody, including torture, daily beatings, electrocution that resulted in about 50 custodial deaths and many more cases of permanent paralysis. Torture is routinely used by security forces in Bangladesh, even though it is a party to the United Nations Convention Against Torture. Human Rights Watch and others have long documented the systematic use of torture in Bangladesh by its security forces, including the army, the RAB and the Directorate General of Forces Intelligence, the country's main intelligence agency.

Around 6000 soldiers were convicted by courts in mass trials and sentenced to terms of imprisonment ranging from four months to seven years including fines for participation in the mutiny. 823 soldiers who allegedly killed their senior officers were charged and tried in a civilian court for murder, torture, conspiracy and other offences.

On 5 November 2013, Dhaka Metropolitan Sessions Court sentenced 152 people to death and 161 to life imprisonment; 256 received sentences of between three and ten years, while 277 were acquitted.
Lawyers for the convicted have said that they would appeal the judgement. Bangladesh Nationalist Party member of Parliament Nasiruddin Ahmed Pintu was among those sentenced to life in Prison.

A Human Rights Watch spokesperson described the mass trial as "an affront to international legal standards". UN High Commissioner for Human Rights Navi Pillay has drawn attention to flaws in the trial, calling it "rife with procedural irregularities, including the lack of adequate and timely access to lawyers". A spokesperson for Amnesty International condemned the sentences, stating that they "seem designed to satisfy a desire for cruel revenge". Some of those accused, more than 50 according to one estimate, are reported to have died while in custody.

Human Rights Watch said in a report that "the mass trials of nearly 6,000 suspects raise serious fair trial concerns". "Those responsible for the horrific violence that left 74 dead should be brought to justice, but not with torture and unfair trials," said Brad Adams, Asia director at Human Rights Watch. "The government's initial response to the mutiny was proportionate and saved lives by refusing army demands to use overwhelming force in a heavily populated area. But since then it has essentially given a green light to the security forces to exact revenge through physical abuse and mass trials."

See also
 List of revolutions and rebellions
 Bangladesh Army
 Bangladesh Rifles
 Human rights in Bangladesh

References

External links

 "Mutiny, bloodshed at BDR HQ"—The Daily Star
 "BDR deserters given 24 hours to rejoin"—The Daily Star

Torture in Bangladesh
2009 crimes in Bangladesh
Conflicts in 2009
2009
Mass murder in 2009
Murder in Bangladesh
Mutinies
Hostage taking in Bangladesh
Military history of Bangladesh
History of Bangladesh (1971–present)
2000s in Dhaka
2009 in military history
Military coups in Bangladesh
2000s coups d'état and coup attempts